Norpseudoephedrine may refer to:

 Cathine (or D-norpseudoephedrine), the (+)-enantiomer and most widely known form of the compound
 L-Norpseudoephedrine, the (-)-enantiomer of the compound

An article for the racemic mixture of the compound does not currently exist.